Specific activity is the activity per unit mass of a radionuclide and is a physical property of that radionuclide.

Activity is a quantity (for which the SI unit is the becquerel) related to radioactivity, and is defined as the number of radioactive transformations per second that occur in a particular radionuclide. The unit of activity is the becquerel (Bq), which is defined as one radioactive decay per second. The older, non-SI unit of activity is the curie (Ci), which is  radioactive decay per second. Another unit of activity is the Rutherford, which is defined as  radioactive decay per second.

Since the probability of radioactive decay for a given radionuclide within a set time interval is fixed (with some slight exceptions, see changing decay rates), the number of decays that occur in a given time of a given mass (and hence a specific number of atoms) of that radionuclide is also a fixed (ignoring statistical fluctuations).

Thus, specific activity is defined as the activity per unit mass of a particular radionuclide. It is usually given in units of Bq/kg, but another commonly used unit of activity is the curie (Ci), allowing specific activity to be given the unit Ci/g. The amount of specific activity should not be confused with level of exposure to ionizing radiation and thus the exposure or absorbed dose. The absorbed dose is the quantity important in assessing the effects of ionizing radiation on humans.

Formulation

Relationship between λ and T1/2

Radioactivity is expressed as the decay rate of a particular radionuclide with decay constant λ and the number of atoms N:

 

The integral solution is described by exponential decay:

 

where N0 is the initial quantity of atoms at time t = 0.

Half-life T1/2 is defined as the length of time for half of a given quantity of radioactive atoms to undergo radioactive decay:

 

Taking the natural logarithm of both sides, the half-life is given by

 

Conversely, the decay constant λ can be derived from the half-life T1/2 as

Calculation of specific activity

The mass of the radionuclide is given by

 

where M is molar mass of the radionuclide, and NA is the Avogadro constant. Practically, the mass number A of the radionuclide is within a fraction of 1% of the molar mass expressed in g/mol and can be used as an approximation.

Specific radioactivity a is defined as radioactivity per unit mass of the radionuclide:

 

Thus, specific radioactivity can also be described by

 

This equation is simplified to

 

When the unit of half-life is in years instead of seconds:

Example: specific activity of Ra-226 

For example, specific radioactivity of radium-226 with a half-life of 1600 years is obtained as

 

This value derived from radium-226 was defined as unit of radioactivity known as the curie (Ci).

Calculation of half-life from specific activity
Experimentally measured specific activity can be used to calculate the half-life of a radionuclide.

Where decay constant λ is related to specific radioactivity a by the following equation:

 

Therefore, the half-life can also be described by

Example: half-life of Rb-87 
Rubidium atomic mass is 87 g/mol, so one gram is 1/87 of a mole. Plugging in the numbers:

Examples

Applications
The specific activity of radionuclides is particularly relevant when it comes to select them for production for therapeutic pharmaceuticals, as well as for immunoassays or other diagnostic procedures, or assessing radioactivity in certain environments, among several other biomedical applications.

References

Further reading
 
 
 

Units of radioactivity